Roxanne Tong Lok Man is a Hong Kong actress and former beauty pageant contestant contracted to TVB.

Background 
Roxanne Tong was born in Hong Kong, the older of two children. Her father, Tong Chun Chung, was an actor. She is the niece of Hong Kong actor Kent Tong. She graduated from University College London with a degree in Psychology.

Career
Roxanne Tong had signed with Primo and became a model. She competed in the Miss Hong Kong 2012 beauty pageant,  receiving the Tourism Ambassador, Beauty Sublimation and Most Popular Pageant on Scene awards, and was eventually placed in  Top 6. Later, she joined TVB and made her acting debut in the sitcom Come Home Love as Lee Sze-sze. She co-hosted the education program Sidewalk Scientist (season 2) as well. In 2014, Tong competed in the Mainland China competition The Chinese Dream Show (中国梦想秀).  Michael Miu came as the special guest for her.  She was eventually placed 4th in the competition.

In 2017, Tong won the Best New TVB Artiste award at the 2017 StarHub TVB Awards. In June 2019, she was cast to replace Jacqueline Wong in reshoot of the sequel Forensic Heroes IV, which was broadcast in February 2020.

Personal life 
Roxanne Tong had been in a relationship with actor Joey Law for four years. They began dating in 2014. After the media reported that the two parties had separated in March 2018, Tong confessed the breakup through Instagram and said she wanted to keep a low profile. On 12 June 2020, Tong and Kenneth Ma were found to be dating in Hung Hom, and they admitted their relationship on Instagram the next day.

Tong is best friends with Tracy Chu, Angel Chiang, Jennifer Shum and Kayi Cheung. She is also good friends with Samantha Ko, Sisley Choi, Telford Wong and Lucas Yiu.

Filmography

Television dramas

Films 
 2019: Line Walker 2 
 2022: Love Suddenly

Awards and nominations

Miss Hong Kong 2012

TVB Anniversary Awards

TVB Star Awards Malaysia

StarHub TVB Awards

Yahoo！Asia Buzz Awards

People's Choice Television Awards

References

TVB actors
21st-century Hong Kong actresses
Living people
1987 births